London-Corbin Airport  (Magee Field) is in Laurel County, Kentucky, three miles south of London and about 12 miles north of Corbin. The airport is operated by both cities.

It has no scheduled airline service; the most recent flights were US Airways Express dba Air Kentucky and Tennessee Airways. From 1953-54 to 1980 the airport was served by Piedmont Airlines (1948-1989) DC-3s, Fairchild Hiller FH-227s and NAMC YS-11s.

Facilities
Its one runway, 6/24, is 5,750 by 150 feet (1,753 x 46 m) asphalt.

In the year ending January 10, 2006 the airport had 13,063 aircraft operations, average 35 per day: 53% general aviation, 31% military and 17% air taxi. 73 aircraft were then based at the airport: 78% single-engine, 7% multi-engine, 3% jet, 10% helicopter, 1% glider, 1% ultralight.

Aircraft construction, maintenance, and repairs are offered on field by Kolb Aircraft, and Ayers Aviation.

The Kentucky National Guard built a readiness facility on the field in 2009, dedicated by Adjutant General Don Storm at opening. 

Congressman Hal Rogers announced that the London-Corbin Airport will receive a $809,332 federal grant from the U.S. Department of Transportation to rehabilitate the runway.

The airport was also awarded a $1.85 million competitive grant through the Federal Aviation Administration. The funding is part of a $5 million project to repair the 6,000 feet of runway.

References

External links
 London-Corbin Airport, official site
 Aerial photo as of 11 March 1997 from USGS The National Map
 

Airports in Kentucky
Buildings and structures in Laurel County, Kentucky
Former Essential Air Service airports
Transportation in Laurel County, Kentucky